Jack Gosiewski (born 29 May 1994) is an Australian professional rugby league footballer who plays as a  forward for the North Queensland Cowboys in the NRL. 

He previously played for the South Sydney Rabbitohs, Manly-Warringah Sea Eagles and the St. George Illawarra Dragons in the National Rugby League.

Background
Gosiewski was born in Murwillumbah, New South Wales, Australia.

He played his junior rugby league for the Mullumbimby Giants, before being signed by the South Sydney Rabbitohs. Gosiewski is of Polish descent.

Playing career

Early career
In 2013 and 2014, Gosiewski played for the South Sydney Rabbitohs' NYC team, captaining the side in 2014. In 2015, he graduated to their New South Wales Cup team, North Sydney Bears. At the conclusion of the 2015 season, he played 18 games for North Sydney and scored 4 tries.

2016
In round 10 of the 2016 NRL season, Gosiewski made his NRL debut for South Sydney against the Parramatta Eels. He played a total of 5 games for South Sydney in 2016, for most of the season though, he featured for North Sydney, making 9 appearances and scoring 3 tries. In October, he re-signed with Souths on a one-year contract until the end of 2017.

2017
Gosiewski spent most of the 2017 NRL season out with a torn patella. After getting match fitness and game time with South Sydney's feeder club North Sydney, he was recalled to the South Sydney lineup and played his sole NRL game of the season in South Sydney's 36-18 victory over the New Zealand Warriors. After not being offered a new contract by Souths, he signed a one-year contract in September, with the Manly-Warringah Sea Eagles starting in 2018.

2018
Gosiewski made his debut for Manly in round 5 against the Gold Coast Titans.  Gosiewski featured in 8 games for Manly as the club endured a torrid 2018 season finishing second last on the table. Gosiewski resigned for the Manly Warringah Sea Eagles for another season, keeping him at the club until the end of 2019.

2019
In round 22 of the 2019 NRL season against Wests Tigers, Gosiewski scored two tries as Manly-Warringah won the match 32-12 at Brookvale Oval.

Gosiewski played 19 games for Manly in the 2019 NRL season as the club finished 6th on the table and qualified for the finals. Gosiewski played in both of Manly's finals matches and scored a try in the club's elimination final loss against South Sydney at ANZ Stadium.

2020
In round 19 of the 2020 NRL season, he scored two tries for Manly-Warringah in their 24-42 loss against the Gold Coast at Brookvale Oval.

He played a total of 13 games for Manly-Warringah in the 2020 NRL season as they finished a disappointing 13th on the table.

2021
Gosiewski played six games for Manly in the 2021 NRL season.  On October 6, he was released by the Manly club. On October 15 Gosiewski signed a one-year deal with the St. George Illawarra Dragons for the 2022 season.

2022
Gosiewski played four games for St. George Illawarra in the 2022 NRL season as the club finished 10th on the table and missed the finals.
On 25 October, Gosiewski signed a one-year deal to join North Queensland starting in 2023.

References

External links

Manly Sea Eagles profile
South Sydney Rabbitohs profile

1994 births
Living people
Australian people of Polish descent
Australian rugby league players
Manly Warringah Sea Eagles players
North Sydney Bears NSW Cup players
Rugby league players from Murwillumbah
Rugby league second-rows
South Sydney Rabbitohs players
St. George Illawarra Dragons players